Kalidas Roy (1889–1975) was a poet of the Tagore era of Bengali literature and a teacher. He was born in Karui village of Bardhaman (now Purba Bardhaman district) at West Bengal in a Vaidya (Baidya) family and was from the family lineage of the Vaishnava poet, Lochan Dash. His father was Jogendranarayan Roy. He wrote in both Arabic and Persian.

Career
He earned his first degree from the Krishnanath College, Berhampore, Bengal Presidency, then affiliated with the University of Calcutta. Later he studied for his MA examinations in philosophy from the Scottish Church College.

During his teaching career, Roy taught in various institutions like Barisha High School (South 24 Parganas, near Kolkata) and Mitra Institution, Bhowanipore Branch, Kolkata, where he served as the Assistant Headmaster.

He was one of the poets of the Tagore era of Bengali literature. His poetry was specially influenced by Vaishnava thoughts. He wrote 19 books of verses. His famous poems include Chhatradhara (The Stream of Students), which describes a teacher's appreciation of his interaction with students, and Triratna (The Three Jewels). In addition to poetry, he also translated Sanskrit works and made critical reviews of books.

In Kolkata he lived in a house near Tollygunge, which he christened as "Sandhyar Kulai" (Evening Abode). He died on 25 October 1975.

Bibliography
A few of his books of poetry are:

Parnaput
Ritu Mangal
Kisholoy
Brojobenu
Boikali
Lajanjali
Ballari
Aharan
Aharani
Khudkunra
Rashkadombo
Purnahuti
Haimanti
Chittachita

Awards
Kavishekhar (The Chief/Topmost Poet, 1920), awarded by Bangiya Sahita Parishad, Rangpur
Jagattarini Swarna Padak (Gold Medal, 1953), from the University of Calcutta
Sarojini Swarna Padak (Gold Medal), from the University of Calcutta
Ananda Purashkar (1963) awarded by Anandabazar Group
Rabindra Purashkar (1968), awarded by for his poetry called "Purnahuti"
Deshikottam (1970), awarded by the Visva Bharati University
Hony. D.Litt. (1972) from the Rabindra Bharati University
Hony. D.Litt. (1976, posthumous) from the University of Burdwan

References

1889 births
1975 deaths
Bengali writers
Bengali Hindus
Bengali male poets
Bengali-language poets
Scottish Church College alumni
University of Calcutta alumni
Recipients of the Rabindra Puraskar
Recipients of the Ananda Purashkar
Indian poets
Indian essayists
Indian male writers
Indian male poets
Indian male essayists
Indian textbook writers
20th-century Indian essayists
20th-century Indian poets
20th-century Indian male writers
20th-century Bengali poets
20th-century Bengalis
Writers from Kolkata
Poets from West Bengal
People from West Bengal
People from Purba Bardhaman district